Bert Gilroy (May 7, 1899 – January 16, 1973) was an American film producer of the 1930s and 1940s. Born in Arizona in 1899, he began his Hollywood career behind the scenes on the 1926 silent film Pals in Paradise.  In 1934, he began producing by overseeing short films for RKO Radio Pictures with Bandits and Ballads, a musical short. After four years of producing shorts, he would be given a chance at producing a full-length feature at RKO, with the western film, Gun Law. Later that year he would produce Painted Desert, a remake of the 1931 film The Painted Desert for which he was the assistant director, and was memorable as containing the first speaking role for Clark Gable. During the decade he was active, he would produce over 150 short and feature films. His feature films would overwhelmingly consist of westerns, many of which would star RKO's leading western star of the 1930s, Tim Holt.  Gilroy spent almost his entire career at RKO studios, after its creation in 1929. His last credited film on which he was an associate producer on in 1946, Hollywood Bound was a compilation of three 1930s Betty Grable RKO short subjects
that was released by Astor Pictures.

Filmography
(as per AFI's database)

References

External links
 
 

American film producers
1899 births
1972 deaths